Haplogroup I2 may refer to:

 Haplogroup I-M438 (Y-DNA)
 Haplogroup I2'3 (mtDNA)